Deutsche Schule zu Porto, in English German School of Oporto or simply DSP, is a German school located in Oporto, Portugal. In Portugal, it is considered a private school, as in Germany it corresponds to a public school.

History 
The German School of Oporto was established on November 18, 1901. On the day before the official opening, a Thanksgiving mass took place. It was third German school in Portugal following one in Lisbon and one in Amora (was later defunct).

Student body 
As of 2009 the school had 700 students. 85% of the students were Portuguese. Germans make up the majority of the other students.

Activities

Sportbegegnung
The Sportbegegnung (in English sports encounter) is an event where the German schools from Oporto, Lisbon, Madrid and Marbella face themselves in sports competitions. Basketball, volleyball, football and handball. The 2007 Sportbegegnung took place in Oporto. Some highlights of the competition were shown on Porto Canal, a channel of Oporto.

Jugend Musiziert
Jugend musiziert is an event where students from all the German schools of the Iberian peninsula meet each other in a Music contest. The contest takes place each year in a different school.

"Schüleraustausch Öttingen/Porto"
The Schüleraustausch (Student exchange) between the German schools of Oporto and Öettingen, Germany was created in 2002. Each student participating in the project receives an exchange partner. Each one goes to the opposite city, in different times. The goal of this project is for the students to exchange knowledges, know other cultures, etc...

References

External links

 

International schools in Porto
Porto
Educational institutions established in 1901
1901 establishments in Portugal